Callosphingia is a genus of moths in the family Sphingidae, containing one species, Callosphingia circe, which is known from semi-desert and arid scrub throughout eastern Africa.

References

Acherontiini
Monotypic moth genera
Moths of Africa
Taxa named by Walter Rothschild
Taxa named by Karl Jordan
Moths described in 1915